North West Air Ambulance is the helicopter emergency medical service (HEMS) that covers the North West England region, consisting of the counties of Cheshire, Cumbria, Lancashire, Greater Manchester and Merseyside.

History
The charity has existed since 1999. It was established with a single aircraft based at Blackpool Airport and has since upgraded to three Eurocopter EC135 aircraft one based at Blackpool Airport the other two at City Airport Manchester (Barton).

In the year ending March 2020, the charity raised £11.2million, including £66,000 from government grants. It spent £11.6M, of which £6.9M was used to provide the air ambulance service.

Fleet
The fleet aircraft can operate under instrument flight rules (IFR), so fly in all weather conditions, day and night. This is the same capability as the neighbouring Great North Air Ambulance Service whose fleet have larger aircraft unable to reach some sites used by the NWAA.

 G-NWAA - based at Blackpool Airport and uses air traffic control callsign Helimed 08. This Aircraft generally covers the Northern counties of Lancashire and Cumbria.
 G-NWEM - based at Barton and uses callsign Helimed 72. This Aircraft generally covers the southern counties of Cheshire, Greater Manchester and Merseyside.
 G-NWAE - based at Barton, uses callsign Helimed 75.

Although the aircraft have their allocated counties, they will often cross into each other's areas should operational needs require it.

In February 2018, a BMW X5 road vehicle  was added to the fleet. This has been given the name "Air Ambulance Response Unit" (or 'RU' for short). As a rapid response vehicle, it enables doctors and paramedics to carry out some of their work during the hours of darkness, poor weather or when an aircraft requires maintenance.

Operations

The paramedics who provide the patient care for incidents attended by NWAA are provided on two year secondments by the North West Ambulance Service. The medics are extensively trained in areas such as helicopter safety, navigation and aviation law as well as advanced medical procedures beyond those performed by their land based colleagues.

In addition to the paramedics, there is always a pre-hospital emergency medicine trained doctor on one helicopter from Manchester Barton base.

The pilots, along with the helicopters themselves are provided by emergency helicopter specialist Babcock Mission Critical Services Onshore.

Control of the aircraft was, until recently, the responsibility of the emergency medical dispatchers working in local North West Ambulance Service control rooms. However, there is now a central Air Desk at Ambulance Control in Broughton, Preston which prioritises requests for the air ambulance in an attempt to increase efficiency.

See also 
Air ambulances in the United Kingdom

References

External links

 
 

Air ambulance services in England